Shakun Batra (born 1 January 1983) is an Indian filmmaker and writer. His first film was the romantic comedy Ek Main Aur Ekk Tu (2012). He followed this with the ensemble family drama Kapoor & Sons (2016) and the Amazon Prime Video original noir romantic drama Gehraiyaan (2022), also his production debut.

Career 

Batra entered the film industry working as a side actor in the film Don: The Chase Begins Again (2006), and then moved on to become an assistant director on films like Jaane Tu... Ya Jaane Na (2008) and Rock On!! (2008), while starring in the former as Nilesh, a minor character.

He made his debut as a writer and director with the offbeat romantic comedy Ek Main Aur Ekk Tu (2012). Rachel Saltz of The New York Times commented, "The happy surprise of Ek Main Aur Ekk Tu is that it's not crude, sniggering or vindictive. Instead it's rather sweet and sometimes even a little unexpected."

Batra's next film was the ensemble family drama Kapoor & Sons (2016). Writing for The Hindu, Namrata Joshi said that the film "keeps you riveted as you move from one family fight to another" and praised Batra for giving "a refreshing new voice to an old, tried and tested trope."

Batra's next was a noir romantic drama that revolves around two couples, starring Deepika Padukone, Siddhant Chaturvedi, Ananya Panday and Dhairya Karwa. The film, also his production debut, was expected to go on floors in March 2020. Titled Gehraiyaan, it was initially slated to premiere directly on Amazon Prime Video on 25 January 2021, but was ultimately pushed to release on the platform on 11 February 2022.

Apart from this, he has also directed the docu-drama Searching for Sheela, which is based on Ma Anand Sheela and features her in the lead. All of his films till date have been produced by Karan Johar under Dharma Productions.

Filmography

Awards and nominations

References

External links 
 

1983 births
Living people
Hindi-language film directors
Indian film directors
Filmfare Awards winners